Cold Lazarus is a four-part British television drama written by Dennis Potter with the knowledge that he was dying of pancreatic cancer.

It forms the second half of a pair with the television serial Karaoke. The two serials were filmed as a single production by the same team; both were directed by Renny Rye and feature Albert Finney as the writer Daniel Feeld. The plays were unique in being co-productions between the BBC and Channel 4, something Potter had expressly requested before his death. The show was first aired on Channel 4 in 1996 on Sunday evenings, with a repeat on BBC1 the following day.

Parts of Karaoke and Cold Lazarus were filmed in the Forest of Dean in Gloucestershire, which is where Dennis Potter was born and raised, and children from local schools including St. Briavels Parochial Primary School appeared in the film as extras in flashbacks.

Both series are available to watch online via the Channel 4 website. Both Karaoke and Cold Lazarus were released on DVD from Acorn Media in September 2010.

Plot
Cold Lazarus is set in the 24th century, in a dystopian Britain where the ruined streets are unsafe, and where society is run by American oligarchs in charge of powerful commercial corporations. Experiences are almost all virtual, and anything deemed authentic (such as coffee and cigarettes) has either been banned or replaced by synthetic substitutes.

At a cryonics research institute in London, funded by the pharmaceuticals tycoon Martina Masdon (played by Diane Ladd), a group of scientists led by Dr. Emma Porlock (Frances de la Tour) is working on reviving the mind of the 20th-century writer Daniel Feeld (Albert Finney), whose head was frozen after Feeld's death shortly after the events of Karaoke. Unable to see any profit in the project, Masdon considers discontinuing it, but the media mogul David Siltz (Henry Goodman), who has been spying on Masdon, envisages making a fortune from broadcasting Feeld's memories on TV, and proposes to Porlock that her team work for him.

Porlock is unaware that a member of her team, Fyodor Glazunov (Ciarán Hinds) is a member of the resistance group RON (‘Reality Or Nothing’), which attempts to undermine the reliance of society upon advanced technology by carrying out violent attacks. Glazunov identifies Kaya, another of Porlock's team, as a potential recruit to his superior Andrew Milton (David Foxxe), but Milton kills Kaya, believing her unsuitable. Angered by Kaya's murder, Glazunov kills Milton. Porlock then discovers the truth about Glazunov but, to distract him from the possibility of killing her, consults with him about the Siltz deal. Glazunov approves of the broadcast of Feeld's memories, which he believes might provoke a revolt against the 'inauthentic' life propagated by the authorities. It is shortly after this that Porlock accepts Siltz's offer, just as Masdon realises the potential of the Lazarus project.

As more of Feeld's thoughts and memories are unearthed, it becomes evident not only that Feeld's mind is conscious of its predicament, but also that Feeld is attempting to communicate with the scientists, and is pleading to be allowed to die. At this point Glazunov, Porlock and Luanda Partington (another long standing member of the team) begin to doubt the morality of their project. Another of their team, Watson, having been coerced into informing on his colleagues, unwittingly denounces Glazunov as a RON member and saboteur. Having been warned, Glazunov heads for the laboratory to put Feeld out of his misery. In the confrontation that ensues, Glazunov is able to kill Siltz, and, after a final communication with Feeld (in which they make eye contact), he destroys the laboratory, Feeld's head, and himself, in the process.

Cast
Albert Finney as Daniel Feeld
Frances de la Tour as Emma Porlock
Ciarán Hinds as Fyodor Glazunov
Ganiat Kasumu as Luanda Partington
Grant Masters as Tony Watson
Carmen Ejogo as Blinda
Diane Ladd as Martina Masdon
Henry Goodman as David Siltz
Claudia Malkovich as Kaya
David Foxxe as Andrew Milton
Donald Sumpter as Doctor Rawl
Rob Brydon as Karl

The series also featured an early TV appearance by Rupert Penry-Jones as a militiaman.

Additionally, some of the cast of Karaoke appear in Feeld's flashbacks.

Legacy
Many of the futuristic costumes made for the actors to wear in Cold Lazarus were later bought by the film company Wibbell Productions and subsequently used in the feature film The Vampires of Bloody Island in 2007.

Wibbell later sold many of them individually to private collectors in 2013.

References

External links
 
 

1996 British television series debuts
1996 British television series endings
1990s British drama television series
BBC television dramas
1990s British science fiction television series
1990s British television miniseries
Channel 4 television dramas
Dystopian television series
Television series produced at Pinewood Studios
Television shows written by Dennis Potter
Cryonics in fiction
Television series set in the 24th century